Lucien Hardy (born 1966) is a theoretical physicist, known for his work on the foundation of quantum physics including Hardy's paradox, a thought experiment he devised in 1992, and his widely cited 2001 axiomatic reconstruction of quantum theory that led to a surge of papers in this area.

Work
In the course of his career he has performed research and lecturing in various universities in Europe. In 1992, he became lecturer in mathematical physics at Maynooth College, The National University of Ireland, subsequently he was a Royal Society postdoctoral fellow at the University of Innsbruck, Austria, lecturer in Mathematical Sciences Department at the University of Durham, UK, and a postdoctoral fellow at La Sapienza University in Rome, Italy.

Starting in 1997, he was a Royal Society university research fellow for five years at the University of Oxford.

, Hardy is affiliated with the University of Waterloo and is among the faculty of the Perimeter Institute for Theoretical Physics.

References

External links 
 Lucien Hardy at the Perimeter Institute
 Lucien Hardy, Institute for Quantum Computing
 Lectures given by Lucien Hardy
 Quantum Mischief Rewrites the Laws of Cause and Effect, popular article

Living people
Theoretical physicists
Quantum physicists
1973 births